Stadionul Petre Libardi is a multi-purpose stadium in Petroșani, Romania. It is currently used mostly for football matches and is the home ground of Jiul Petroșani. The stadium holds 15,500 people and was built in 1982. In 2019 the stadium was renamed "Petre Libardi", in honor of Jiul Petroșani's captain from the successful 1973–1974 Cupa României final.

References

External links
 StadiumDB.com images

Petroșani
Football venues in Romania
Buildings and structures in Hunedoara County
Multi-purpose stadiums in Romania